Wiser for the Time is the fifth live album by American southern rock band The Black Crowes, released on March 18, 2013. This marks their return from hiatus and is the first Black Crowes live album since Warpaint Live in 2009. Recorded during a five-night run in New York City (NYC) in their supporting tour for the 2010 album Croweology and released as vinyl or download. It includes live recordings (15 acoustic & 11 electric) from the band's 2010 NYC performances and four covers: "Hot Burrito #1" and "Hot Burrito #2" from The Flying Burrito Brothers,  Little Feat's "Willin" and Bob Dylan's "Tonight I'll Be Staying Here with You".

Track listing

Disc One
 "Cursed Diamond" – 7:21
 "Sister Luck" – 6:21
 "Smile" – 4:40
 "Downtown Money Waster" – 4:47
 "Hot Burrito #1" (The Flying Burrito Brothers cover) – 4:06
 "Hot Burrito #2" (The Flying Burrito Brothers cover) – 4:36
 "Garden Gate" – 4:35
 "Better When You’re Not Alone" – 6:46
 "Darling Of The Underground Press" – 4:27
 "Jealous Again" – 5:44
 "Hotel Illness" – 4:22
 "Thunderstorm" – 4:37
 "Oh The Rain" – 6:21

Disc Two
 "Soul Singing – 4:53
 "Tonight I’ll Be Staying Here With You" (Bob Dylan cover) – 3:34
 "Exit" – 6:17
 "No Speak No Slave" – 5:02
 "(Only) Halfway To Everywhere" – 10:44
 "A Conspiracy" – 5:08
 "Title Song" – 8:35
 "My Morning Song/Stare It Cold" – 11:19
 "Tied Up & Swallowed" – 5:58
 "Make Glad" – 5:08
 "Waiting Guilty" – 8:52
 "She Talks To Angels" – 6:15
 "Willin" (Liitle Feat cover) – 5:31

Personnel

Lead Vocals, guitar: Chris Robinson
Guitar, vocals: Rich Robinson
Guitar: Luther Dickinson
Bass: Sven Pipien
Drums: Steve Gorman
Keyboards: Adam MacDougall

References

External links
 Music Direct

2009 live albums
The Black Crowes live albums
Relativity Records live albums